The Indian Institute of Management Visakhapatnam (IIMV) is a public business school and Institute of National Importance located in Visakhapatnam, Andhra Pradesh, India. It is one of the twenty Indian Institutes of Management. The institution started the first batch of its Post Graduate Program (PGP) in Management from August 2015.  Visakhapatnam (also known as Vizag) is the largest city in Indian state of Andhra Pradesh. The city is the administrative headquarters of Visakhapatnam district and the Eastern Naval Command of Indian Navy. Its geographical location is amidst Eastern Ghats mountain range and the coast of Bay of Bengal.

Academics 

The institute offers Post Graduate, Doctoral and Executive Education programmes. The Post Graduate Programme in Management (PGP), a two-year, full-time residential MBA programme is the flagship programme, offered to candidates admitted through the Common Admission Test. PGP at IIMV is a general, fully integrated management programme and includes courses in accounting, behavioral sciences, finance, economics, human resource management, marketing, business operations, public policy, strategy, entrepreneurship and general management. IIM Visakhapatnam also offers two year part-time executive MBA programme for working executives.  From 2019, IIMV started its Doctor of Business Administration (DBA) programme under the guidance of its mentor  IIMB.

In 2019, IIM Visakhapatnam launched an executive programme one-of-its-kind, Post Graduate Program in Digital Governance and Management (PGP-DGM), leading to the award of MBA degree. This Programme is launched under the aegis of the National e-Governance Division (NeGD), Ministry of Electronics and Information Technology (MeitY), Govt. of India (GOI).

Campus and location 

IIM Visakhapatnam is initially functioning out of the campus of Andhra University, while the permanent campus would come up at Gambhiram on the outskirts of city. In the temporary campus the classrooms are designed as per the Harvard Business School model, as the teaching methodology is case study based. "This semicircle gallery model helps better interaction between the teacher and the students", as per Sourav Mukherji, Dean- Programmes (IIM-B). The land acquisition for the permanent campus is almost complete.
The foundation stone for the new campus was laid by Union Human Resource Development Minister, Smriti Irani on 17 January 2015. The campus is slated to come up on a 240-acre area.

The institute is headed by Director, Prof Chandrasekhar Mylavarapu, an IIT Bombay, Delhi Alumnus and ex-Director of ASCI, Hyderabad.

See also 

 Indian Institutes of Management
 Indian Institute of Management Bangalore

References

External links 
 IIM Visakhapatnam Website

Business schools in Andhra Pradesh
 
Universities and colleges in Visakhapatnam
Colleges affiliated to Andhra University
Uttarandhra
2015 establishments in Andhra Pradesh
Educational institutions established in 2015